Plumipalpiella is a genus of moths of the family Crambidae. It contains only one species, Plumipalpiella martini, which is found in North America, where it has been recorded from California.

References

Natural History Museum Lepidoptera genus database

Odontiini
Monotypic moth genera
Moths of North America
Taxa named by Eugene G. Munroe
Crambidae genera